Aleksandar Stoychev Mladenov (born 25 June 1982) is a Bulgarian former footballer who played as a midfielder. He is the son of Stoycho Mladenov.

Career
Mladenov was born in Sofia.

He played in Germany for Hertha BSC and Karlsruher SC and in Russia for Tom Tomsk.

On 25 March 2010, Mladenov signed a one-year contract with FC Krasnodar.

References

1982 births
Living people
Bulgarian footballers
Bulgarian expatriate footballers
Expatriate footballers in Russia
Expatriate footballers in Germany
Expatriate footballers in Ukraine
Bulgarian expatriate sportspeople in Ukraine
Hertha BSC players
Hertha BSC II players
Karlsruher SC players
PFC CSKA Sofia players
FC Tom Tomsk players
PFC Slavia Sofia players
FC Krasnodar players
PFC Kaliakra Kavarna players
FC Etar 1924 Veliko Tarnovo players
FC Lokomotiv 1929 Sofia players
Bundesliga players
2. Bundesliga players
First Professional Football League (Bulgaria) players
Russian Premier League players
Ukrainian Premier League players
Association football midfielders